Erica Jennifer Fernandes is an Indian actress and model, who works in Indian television and films. She got her breakthrough with her television debut, portraying Dr. Sonakshi Bose in Kuch Rang Pyar Ke Aise Bhi. Erica has also acted in many films in South including Ninnindale and Galipatam. Erica is also known for her portrayal of Prerna Sharma in Kasautii Zindagii Kay.

Early life
Erica was born in Mumbai to Ralph Fernandes and Lavina Fernandes, in a Konkani Mangalorean Catholic family. She did her schooling from Holy Cross High School, Kurla and completed her Pre-Degree Course from Sies College Of Arts, Science & Commerce, Sion. She had enrolled for a BA degree from St Andrew's College, Bandra. Later she discontinued her studies to pursue a career in modelling.

Career

Modelling career 
She always aspired to be a model since childhood, which earned her the crown of "Bombay Times Fresh Face", "Pantaloons Femina Miss Fresh Face 2011" and "Pantaloons Femina Miss Maharashtra" in 2010 and 2011 respectively.

Film debut and success (2013–2015)
Director Sasi had seen pictures of her at Meera Kathiravan's office, with whom she was shooting another film, when he was casting for Ainthu Ainthu Ainthu. Sasi offered her a role of a software engineer in the film alongside Bharath, who plays her love interest. Due to the delay of her other films, Ainthu Ainthu Ainthu became her first release. In 2014, she made her debut in Kannada with the film Ninnindale, featuring alongside Puneeth Rajkumar, which was followed by her debut Hindi film, Babloo Happy Hai, directed by Nila Madhab Panda.

She was selected to play the lead role in the bilingual Virattu/Dega, featuring newcomer Sujiv, son of the director Kumar. In February 2014, Virattu eventually released. Its Telugu version Dega, however, was pushed to late 2014 and Galipatam became her first Telugu release. The film received decent reviews from critics, who also noted that Erica "does a good job" and "shows maturity". In 2015, she appeared in the Kannada film Buguri.

Television debut, breakthrough and success (2016–2020)
In 2016, Fernandes made her television debut with Sony TV's Kuch Rang Pyar Ke Aise Bhi where she portrayed Dr. Sonakshi Bose, opposite Shaheer Sheikh. The show was a new age show and her onscreen chemistry with Shaheer Sheikh was appreciated.

Her delayed film with Kathiravan, Vizhithiru, released on 6 October 2017 and saw her feature amongst an ensemble cast including Krishna, Venkat Prabhu and Sara Arjun.

From 2018 to 2020, she portrayed Prerna Sharma in StarPlus's Kasautii Zindagii Kay, opposite Parth Samthaan.

Recent work
In 2021, Fernandes reprised her role of Dr. Sonakshi Bose opposite Shaheer Sheikh in the third season of Kuch Rang Pyar Ke Aise Bhi: Nayi Kahaani. 

She is currently hosting Emirates Draw. a game show in Dubai, which is live streamed across Emirates Draw's digital platforms YouTube, Facebook, and Website.

Media
In 2017, Fernandes was ranked fourth in The Times of Indias Most Desirable Women on Indian Television List.

She was also listed third in The Times of Indias Most Desirable Women on Indian Television List 2018.

Fernandes was placed 13th in Eastern Eyes 50 Sexiest Asian Women of 2019 List and fourth in The Times of Indias Most Desirable Women On Television List 2019.

Fernandes was ranked first in The Times Most Desirable Women on TV 2020.

Filmography

Films

Television

Web

Music videos

Awards and nominations

See also

 List of Indian television actresses
 List of Indian film actresses

References

External links

 

Living people
Female models from Mumbai
Actresses in Tamil cinema
Actresses in Hindi cinema
Actresses from Mumbai
Actresses in Telugu cinema
21st-century Indian actresses
Indian Christians
Indian film actresses
Mangaloreans
Actresses in Kannada cinema
Actresses in Hindi television
Indian television actresses
Year of birth missing (living people)